Edward Anthony Beck (21 March 1848 - 12 April 1916) was a British academic in the last third of the 19th century and the first decades of the 20th.

Beck was educated at Bishop's Stortford College and Trinity College, Cambridge, where he was to spend the rest of his career. He was Scholar in 1867; Chancellor's English Medallist, 1868 and 1870; Fellow from 1871 to 1902; Seatonian Prizeman in 1874; Assistant Tutor in 1875; Junior Tutor in 1885; Senior Tutor in 1887; and Senior proctor from 1881 to 1888, when he became Vice Master. He was Master of Trinity Hall, Cambridge from his election in November 1902 until his death; and Vice-Chancellor of the University of Cambridge from 1904 until 1906.

References 

1848 births
1916 deaths
Alumni of Trinity Hall, Cambridge
20th-century English Anglican priests
Vice-Chancellors of the University of Cambridge
Fellows of Trinity Hall, Cambridge
Masters of Trinity Hall, Cambridge
People educated at Bishop's Stortford College